The Keston Institute (Keston College) is an organisation dedicated to the study of religion and communist countries, based in Oxford, England. It was founded in 1969 by the Revd Canon Michael Bourdeaux (March 19, 1934   Cornwall, United Kingdom - March 29, 2021).

History
In the 1950s, Michael Bourdeaux spent a year in Moscow as a part of the first wave of British exchange students; he soon found only 41 Russian Orthodox Churches to still be functioning out of the 1,600 before the Russian Revolution in 1917. This prompted him to take up the cause of those persecuted for their religious faith.

In 1969 Bourdeaux founded at Chislehurst the Centre for the Study of Religion and Communism together with Sir John Lawrence, and with the help of Leonard Schapiro and Peter Reddaway, Professor of Political Science and International Affairs at George Washington University. In the early 1970s he bought the old parish school on Keston Common and the centre was renamed Keston College. Later it broadened its purview to include former communist countries with its main concerns being the former Soviet Union and the Eastern Bloc. Over the years it played a key role in the revival of the Russian Orthodox Church, and has become a leading voice on religious freedom in former communist countries, with an emphasis on the former Soviet Union. Eventually the enterprise was relocated to Oxford.

In 1984 Michael Bourdeaux won the Templeton Prize. Bourdeaux retired from Keston in 1999. The current chairman at the Keston Institute is Xenia Dennen.

Since 2007, the Keston Institute's archive and library have been under the care of the Keston Center for Religion, Politics, & Society at Baylor University, Waco, Texas.

See also
Giles Udy

References

External links
  Keston Institute Official Website
 Baylor University Keston Center

Organizations established in 1969
Organisations based in Oxford
Schools of religion
Baylor University
1969 establishments in England
Religion and politics